Longshouyuan station, is a station of Line 2 of the Xi'an Metro. It started operations on 16 September, 2011.

References

Railway stations in Shaanxi
Railway stations in China opened in 2011
Xi'an Metro stations